The 2015 Shanghai Challenger was a professional tennis tournament played on hard courts. It was the fifth edition of the tournament which was part of the 2015 ATP Challenger Tour. It took place in Shanghai, China between 7 and 13 September 2015.

Singles main-draw entrants

Seeds

 1 Rankings are as of August 31, 2015.

Other entrants
The following players received wildcards into the singles main draw:
  Bai Yan
  He Yecong
  Hua Runhao
  Zhang Zhizhen

The following players received entry courtesy of a protected ranking:
  Amir Weintraub

The following players received entry from the qualifying draw:
  Sriram Balaji
  Daniil Medvedev
  Nicolas Meister
  Andrew Whittington

Champions

Singles

  Yuki Bhambri def.  Wu Di 3–6, 6–0, 7–6(7–3)

Doubles

  Wu Di /  Yi Chu-huan def.  Thomas Fabbiano /  Luca Vanni 6–3, 7–5

External links

Shanghai Challenger
Shanghai Challenger
Shanghai Challenger